Parapsestis cinerea is a moth in the family Drepanidae. It was described by Gyula M. László, Gábor Ronkay, László Aladár Ronkay and Thomas Joseph Witt in 2007. It is found in China in Henan, Shaanxi, Gansu, Zhejiang, Hubei, Guangxi, Sichuan, Jilin, Liaoning and Beijing, the Russian Far East and Korea.

Subspecies
Parapsestis cinerea cinerea (China: Henan, Shaanxi, Gansu, Zhejiang, Hubei, Guangxi, Sichuan)
Parapsestis cinerea pacifica Laszlo, G. Ronkay, L. Ronkay & Witt, 2007 (south-eastern Russia, Korean Peninsula, China: Jilin, Liaoning, Beijing)

References

Moths described in 2007
Thyatirinae
Moths of Asia